Buchanan Valley Township is a former township in Emmons County, North Dakota.  Its population as of the 2000 Census was 40. The township was dissolved on March 23, 2009, and added to the census-designated North Emmons Unorganized Territory.

References

External links
Official map by the United States Census Bureau; Emmons County listed on page 7

Former townships in Emmons County, North Dakota
Defunct townships in North Dakota
Populated places disestablished in 2009